Diaphania glauculalis is a moth in the family Crambidae. It was first described by Achille Guenée in 1854 and is found in Haiti, Costa Rica, Panama and Ecuador.

References

Diaphania
Moths described in 1854
Moths of Central America
Moths of South America
Taxa named by Achille Guenée